Qaraağac (also, Garaaghaj, Garaaghadzh and Karaagach) is a municipality and village in the Sadarak District of Nakhchivan, Azerbaijan. It is located 5 km in the north-east from the district center, in the important strategic position. Its population is busy with grain-growing, vegetable-growing, vine-growing and animal husbandry. There are secondary school and a medical center in the village. It has a population of 3,859.

Etymology
Its name is related with Qaraağac (Garaaghaj) forest which is located in the end of the strait of the Cəhənnəm dərə (Hell valley), in Sadarak. Garaaghaj is a type of the tree. The name of the tree is made out from the Turkic words of qara (black, strong, hard) and ağac (tree) means ( Black tree).

History
In 1997, by the decision of the Supreme Assembly of Nakhchivan Autonomous Republic, it was separated from the Sadarak village and became an independent administrative unit.

References

Populated places in Sadarak District